Speak for Yourself is the second solo album by British singer Imogen Heap, following her collaborative effort with Guy Sigsworth as Frou Frou. The album was released in the United States in 2005. It was written, produced, arranged, and funded by Heap, without the backing of a record label, and features guest appearances from Jeff Beck, who provides a guitar solo on "Goodnight and Go", and Heap's ex-boyfriend, Richie Mills, who argues with her on "The Moment I Said It".

Development
Heap recorded Speak for Yourself between her 26th and 27th birthdays. While recording the album, Heap kept a graph on which she had the keys of songs on the X axis and the tempos of songs on the Y axis so as to prevent herself from repeating song structures. The album was primarily recorded in her flat in Bermondsey, London. "I Am in Love with You" was written by Heap at age 19 while she was on tour with Rufus Wainwright, while "Clear the Area" was the first song on the album to be fully written. The song "Daylight Robbery" was written for an advertising agency.

The album's cover was created by Heap's boyfriend at the time, who had been editing a photo of her taken by a friend in Los Angeles, while the title was the first thing that she thought of after seeing it. Speak for Yourself was released in the United States in 2005, and released in the UK through Imogen Heap's own label, Megaphonic Records, in a digipak created specifically by Heap, before being licensed to White Rabbit Recordings in 2006 for the UK and international markets. It is licensed to RCA and Sony Legacy in the US, where the first run of 10,000 copies were copy protected and encased in the digipak. As of August 2009, it has sold 431,000 copies in the US according to Nielsen SoundScan. The album has also achieved Gold status in Canada. In the United Kingdom the album has sold 39,000 copies. Songs "Hide and Seek", "Speeding Cars" and "Goodnight and Go" have sold 647,000, 223,000 and 159,000 copies in United States.

Speak for Yourself was re-released digitally in deluxe, standard, and instrumental versions on 24 December 2012 by Sony BMG.

Critical reception

Accolades
NPR's Ned Wharton named Speak for Yourself one of the best albums of 2005. Also for NPR, American radio presenter Nic Harcourt named "Have You Got It in You?" one of the best songs of 2005.

Track listing

Charts

Weekly charts

Year-end charts

Certifications

Personnel
Credits adapted from Tidal.

 Imogen Heapvocals, production, mixing, engineering, programming
 Richie Millsbackground vocals (1, 12), drums (34, 7, 11)
 Mich Gerberbass (1, 3)
 Jeff Beckguitar (2)

Release history

References

2005 albums
Imogen Heap albums
Albums produced by Imogen Heap